Chetan Hansraj (born 15 June 1972) is an Indian film and television actor.

Career
Hansraj started his career as a child actor in 1980, doing over 250 press advertisements and 30 ad films, and his debut film Kook Doo Koo was selected for the children's films festival in France in 1984. He made his television debut with a role as young Balram in "Mahabharat" by B.R. Chopra.

Kkusum as Garv. Later, he played in Kahaani Ghar Ghar Kii as Sasha, Virrudh as Rudraksh and Dharti Ka Veer Yodha Prithviraj Chauhan as Raja Bhimdev. He also appeared in the music video of Shweta Shetty's pop album song 'Deewane to Deewane hai', with Kushal Punjabi and Akashdeep Saigal, which was released in 1997. He also appeared in reality shows like Fear Factor India and Iss Jungle Se Mujhe Bachao.

Personal life
Hansraj married Lavania Pereira on 12 December 2004 and the couple has a son.

Television
{| class="wikitable sortable"
|-
! Year
! Title
! Role
|-
|1989
|Mahabharat
| Young Balram
|-
|2001
|Ssshhhh...Koi Hai
|Doosri Dulhan as Raja Saab / Pahadi Raja (Episode 18)
|-
| rowspan="4" |2002
|Ssshhhh...Koi Hai
|Ghar as Michael (Episode 28)
|-
|Ssshhhh...Koi Hai
|Samandar as Sotya (Episode 35)
|-
|Krishna Arjun
| Rahul (episodes 3-4)
|-
|Ssshhhh...Koi Hai
| Benu (Episode 59)
|-
|2002-2004
|Kyun Hota Hai Pyarrr
|Rocky
|-
|2003
|Ssshhhh...Koi Hai Vikraal Aur Dracula : Part 1 - Part 3
|Dracula (episodes 86-88)
|-
|2003-2005
|Kkusum
|Advocate Garv Sachdev
|-
|2004
|Kya Hadsaa Kya Haqeeqat - Kab Kaisey Kahan 
|Moksh Chauhan (episodes 226-252)
|-
|2004-2008
|Kahaani Ghar Ghar Kii
| Shashank (Sasha) Garg
|-
| rowspan="2" |2005
|Kaisa Ye Pyar Hai
|Josh
|-
|Kyunki Saas Bhi Kabhi Bahu Thi
|Inspector Maan Singh Chauhan
|-
| rowspan="3" |2006
|C.I.D. - Murder At Midnight
|Dhruv (Episode 412)
|-
|Twinkle Beauty Parlour Lajpat Nagar
|as Ranjeet Singh
|-
|Instant Khichdi
| Rakesh Bhikari
|-
|2006-2007
|Kaajjal
| Dhruv
|-
|2006-2007
|Dharti Ka Veer Yodha Prithviraj Chauhan
|Raja Bhimdev (Bhimdev II)
|-
| rowspan="3" |2007
|Lucky - Bhediya : Part 1 - Part 3
|Bhediya (episodes 13-15)
|-
|Ssshhhh...Phir Koi Hai
|Tattoo Man as Max (Episode 20)
|-
|Virrudh
|Rudraksh Raisinghania
|-
|2008
|Kahaani Hamaaray Mahaabhaarat Ki
| Bheem
|-
|2009
|Baa Bahoo Aur Baby
|Kukku
|-
|2010-2011
|Mata Ki Chowki
|Rudra Narayan (Bali)
|-
| rowspan="2" |2012
|Veer Shivaji
| Inayat Khan
|-
|Kya Huaa Tera Vaada
|Shaurya Mitra
|-
|2013-2015
|Jodha Akbar
|Adham Khan / Haider Khan
|-
| rowspan="4" |2014
|Encounter
| Mangesh (Mangya) Waghmare (episodes 7-9)
|-
|SuperCops vs Supervillains
|Danny (Episode 16)
|-
|Devon Ke Dev...Mahadev
|Nighast
|-
|Akbar Birbal
|
|-
| rowspan="3" |2015
|Savdhaan India
| ACP Rehmat Khan (Episode 1118)
|-
|Maha Kumbh: Ek Rahasaya, Ek Kahani
| Makhardhwaj
|-
|Bhagyalaxmi
| Yuvraj Malhotra
|-
| rowspan="3" |2016
|Janbaaz Sindbad
|Rawat
|-
|Naagarjuna - Ek Yoddha
| Naagraj
|-
|Ek Tha Raja Ek Thi Rani
|Kaal
|-
|2016-2017
|Chandra Nandini
|Parvatak Malayketu
|-
| rowspan="2" |2017
|Mahakali — Anth Hi Aarambh Hai
|Malla
|-
|Peshwa Bajirao
|Muhammad Azam Shah
|-
|2018–2019
|Naagin 3
| Anand (Andy) Sehgal
|-
|2018
|Laal Ishq
| Soul Transformation as Abhishek (Episode 16)
|-
| rowspan="2" |2019
|Haiwaan
|Yeti Master
|-
|RadhaKrishn
| Ravana
|-
| rowspan="2" |2020
|Alif Laila
|Magician Mingla
|-
|Brahmarakshas 2
|Brahmarakshas
|-
| rowspan="2" | 2021
|Mann Kee Awaaz Pratigya 2
| Balwant Tyagi
|-
| Mauka-E-Vardaat
|Senior Inspector
|-
| 2022
| Shubh Shagun| Brijesh
|-
|}

Non-fiction shows

2006 Fear Factor India as Contestant
2008 Mr. & Ms. TV as Contestant
2008 Kaun Jeetega Bollywood Ka Ticket as Contestant
2008 Saas v/s Bahu as Guest
2008 Nach Baliye 4 as Contestant
2009 Iss Jungle Se Mujhe Bachao as Contestant
2013 Welcome – Baazi Mehmaan Nawazi Ki'' as Contestant
2022 Lock Upp (Season 1) as Contestant [Entered-Day 21, Ejected-Day 27]

Filmography

References

External links
 
 

Living people
Male actors from Mumbai
Indian male film actors
Male actors in Hindi cinema
Male actors in Telugu cinema
Indian male television actors
Indian male soap opera actors
1972 births
21st-century Indian male actors
Actors from Mumbai